Power Rangers Operation Overdrive is the fifteenth season of the television franchise Power Rangers. The season uses footage and other material from the 30th Super Sentai series GoGo Sentai Boukenger, which celebrates the thirtieth anniversary of that franchise. In addition, this season's team-up episode, "Once a Ranger", commemorates the fifteenth anniversary of the Power Rangers franchise. The season premiered on February 26, 2007, on Toon Disney's Jetix programming block. It was the first season to use high definition footage from the Super Sentai franchise, although this footage was scaled down to 4:3 aspect ratio.

Unique among Power Ranger series, Operation Overdrive has the Rangers exploring, operating and fighting in many different countries around the world, rather than focusing only on their home city of San Angeles.

Pre-production
The early working title for the series was Power Rangers Drive Force, but was later changed to "Relic Hunters" and then "Operation Overdrive"

In early pre-production, on July 26, 2006, the series' logo was posted on a fan message board called "Fuñaroboard." This same logo was later featured on the Disney website, RangerSecrets.com, as part of the preview for the series. The logo is very similar to that of the parent series Boukenger in the basic design and format.

On November 14, 2006, Disney had set up its official website for Power Rangers Operation Overdrive.

Synopsis
Five brave, skilled, and adventurous young people are chosen to search for several magical jewels that were long ago taken from the Corona Aurora (also known as "Crown of the Gods"), so as to prevent them from coming into the possession of Moltor and Flurious, who are brothers connected to ice and fire banished long ago by the Corona's guardian for having attempted to steal it. When the billionaire explorer Andrew Hartford discovered the Corona Aurora, they escaped their exile and rallied their allies. In response, Andrew Hartford selected the talented youths and modified their DNA so as to grant them exceptional physical powers by which to combat the evil. Although Moltor and Flurious initially attempted to work together, they soon became rivals. The Corona Aurora fell into Moltor's hands; yet without its jewels, it could not grant the owner universal power. Later, the evil warriors Kamdor and Miratrix began hunting for the jewels, as did the extraterrestrial 'Fearcats'. Now the Rangers, joined by a Mercurian named Tyzonn who joined their ranks as the Mercury Ranger, are forced to fight multiple villains and travel worldwide in the effort to capture the jewels before their enemies can.

In order to accomplish this purpose, the members of Operation Overdrive are equipped with futuristic technology similar to that featured in previous Power Ranger continuities, which improves in sophistication and power with successive episodes. Each time a new Ranger, new weapon, or (in one subplot, if not more) new reason for battle is introduced, that Ranger, weapon, or reason produces the decimation of one major enemy (such as Kamdor and Miratrix) or a host of foot soldiers. Thereafter the odds resume their former state. The physical powers granted by genetic modification are seldom used, seen, or mentioned, except when one or more Rangers is rescued by their use. Throughout the series, legends are included or invented to give a feeling of antiquity: these include Thor's Hammer, Atlantis and Poseidon, who is mentioned under the Roman name, Neptune.

Cast and characters
Overdrive Rangers
 James Maclurcan as Mackenzie "Mack" Hartford; The Red Overdrive Ranger.
 Samuell Benta as William "Will" Aston; The Black Overdrive Ranger.
 Gareth Yuen as Dax Lo; The Blue Overdrive Ranger.
 Caitlin Murphy as Veronica "Ronny" Robinson; The Yellow Overdrive Ranger.
Rhoda Montemayor as Rose Ortiz; The Pink Overdrive Ranger.
 Dwayne Cameron as Tyzonn; The Mercury Ranger.

Supporting characters
 Rod Lousich as Andrew Hartford, the Rangers' mentor and Mack's father.
 David Weatherley as Spencer.
 Campbell Cooley as the voice of Alpha 6.
 Nic Sampson as the voice of the Sentinel Knight.
 Beth Allen as Vella.

Villains
 Gerald Urquhart as Flurious.
 Mark Ferguson as the voice of Moltor.
 Ria Vandervis as Miratrix.
 Adam Gardiner as the voice of Kamdor.
 James Gaylyn as the voice of Cheetar.
 Lori Dungey as the voice of Crazar.
 David Weatherley as the voice of Benglo.
 Kelson Henderson as Norg and the voice of Mig.
 Glen Levy as the voice of Thrax.

Guest stars
 Johnny Yong Bosch as Adam Park; the second Black Ranger, and previously the Black Ninja Ranger, Green Zeo Ranger and the first Green Turbo Ranger.
 Sally Martin as Tori Hanson; the Blue Wind Ranger.
 Emma Lahana as Kira Ford; the Yellow Dino Thunder Ranger.
 Matt Austin as Bridge Carson; the third S.P.D. Red Ranger, following a promotion at S.P.D.
 Richard Brancatisano as Xander Bly; the Green Mystic Force Ranger.

Episodes

References

External links

 Official Power Rangers Website
 Power Rangers Operation Overdrive - Blue Sapphire Volume 3
 

 
Operation Overdrive
2000s American science fiction television series
2007 American television series debuts
2007 American television series endings
American Broadcasting Company original programming
American children's action television series
American children's adventure television series
American children's fantasy television series
Androids in television
English-language television shows
Television series about genetic engineering
Television series by Disney
Television shows filmed in New Zealand
Television shows set in Africa
Television shows set in Asia
Television shows set in Europe
Television shows set in South America
Television shows set in Oceania
Television shows set in North America
Television shows set in Auckland
Television series about size change
Treasure hunt television series